Scoparia tuicana is a species of moth in the family Crambidae.  It is endemic to New Zealand.

Taxonomy
This species was described by Charles E. Clarke in 1926. However the placement of this species within the genus Scoparia is in doubt. As a result, this species has also been referred to as Scoparia (s.l.) tuicana.

Description
The wingspan is about 14 mm. The forewings are white and light ochreous, marked with black. The hindwings are grey-ochreous merging into blackish outwardly. Adults have been recorded on wing in November.

References

Moths described in 1926
Moths of New Zealand
Scorparia
Endemic fauna of New Zealand
Endemic moths of New Zealand